Jalbai is a village of the Lahor Tehsil in Swabi District of Khyber Pakhtunkhwa. Jalbai is named after its position as Jail B during British Rule. 

The people are Pashtuns and Muslim.People Live there with peace and hospitality.Jalbai is also known as the village of sher zaman sher he is known as fahre swabi . The youngest Nazim in the history of jalbai is Malik suhaib Ahmad and he is a chairman of this village.
 The MPA of this region is Mohammad Ali and MNA is Usman Tarqae. Jalbai's famous mosque is Bhai musjid and the famous person in Jalbai is Mujeeb ur Rehman known as (Nazim sab).
He introduce one of the 1st and modern dairy farm in the village where imported animals are available for milking and sale purpose located at opposite BHU.
The village has one high school and some primary schools and public schools—Alama Iqbal High school, Jalbai public school, Alnoor public school, Rahman public school. The medium of these schools is Pashto and Urdu. Although the main occupation of Jalbai has primarily been farming or trading in farming products, a significant number of people contribute to the economy of the village by sending in remittances from the Persian Gulf where they work, and some people work at Darra Adam Khel. The main industry of the village is agriculture, including wheat and tobacco. The literacy rate is 85 percent.

References

Populated places in Swabi District